The 2022–23 Lehigh Mountain Hawks men's basketball team represented Lehigh University in the 2022–23 NCAA Division I men's basketball season. The Mountain Hawks, led by 16th-year head coach Brett Reed, played their home games at Stabler Arena in Bethlehem, Pennsylvania as members of the Patriot League. They finished the season 16–14, 11–7 in Patriot League play to finish in a tie for second place. As the No. 3 seed in the Patriot League tournament, they lost to Lafayette in the quarterfinals.

Previous season
The Mountain Hawks finished the 2021–22 season 13–19, 10–8 in Patriot League play to finish in fourth place. They defeated Army in the quarterfinals of the Patriot League tournament, before falling to top-seeded Colgate in the semifinals.

Roster

Schedule and results

|-
!colspan=12 style=| Non-conference regular season

|-
!colspan=12 style=| Patriot League regular season

|-
!colspan=9 style=| Patriot League tournament

|-

Sources

References

Lehigh Mountain Hawks men's basketball seasons
Lehigh Mountain Hawks
Lehigh Mountain Hawks men's basketball
Lehigh Mountain Hawks men's basketball